Kottke may refer to:
 Leo Kottke - acoustic guitar player
 Jason Kottke - blogger
 Daniel Kottke - U.S. computer engineer and the first official Apple Computer employee